Rabigh Refining & Petrochemical Company (Petro Rabigh) is a Saudi Arabia-based company which produces and markets refined hydrocarbon and petrochemicals. was founded in 2005 as a joint venture between  Saudi Aramco and Japan’s Sumitomo Chemical. The company was a joint venture between and which is now publicly held. It is traded on the Saudi Stock Exchange (TADAWUL:2380). The plant is valued at about SAR 16.71 billion (25% funded by the public and the remainder equally funded by Saudi Aramco and Sumitomo Chemical) and originally produced 18.4 million tons per annum (mtpa) of petroleum-based products and 2.4 mtpa of ethylene and propylene-based derivatives. 

Petro Rabigh products are used in such end products as plastics, detergents, lubricants, resins, coolants, anti-freeze, paint, carpets, rope, clothing, shampoo, auto interiors, epoxy glue, insulation, film, fibers, household appliances, packaging, candles, pipes and many other applications.

Petro Rabigh II is an expansion project valued at US $9 billion that reached full production by 4th Quarter 2017 and provided a wide range of new high value-added products, some of which are exclusive to the Kingdom of Saudi Arabia and the Middle East.

Petro Rabigh products have a vast range of applications that offer innovative downstream investors the chance to establish new industries in the region, bringing with them new skills and job opportunities. Petro Rabigh also offers many exciting investment opportunities through Petro Rabigh industrial complex (Rabigh PlusTech Park) which is the first private Industrial Park for conversion industries in Saudi Arabia, and is designed to accommodate polymer compounding Third Party Projects.

It is a site next to Petro Rabigh where downstream industries utilize Petro Rabigh products as feedstock to produce chemical compounds such as polyols, polymer stabilizers, xylenes and solvents. The Rabigh Plastic Technical Center (R-PTC), a state-of-the-art facility run by Sumitomo Chemical, provides technical support and training in plastic processing technology.

As such, Petro Rabigh is at the hub of an upsurge in economic and technological development in line with Saudi Arabia's Vision 2030 to create a vibrant society, a thriving economy and an ambitious nation.

It is considered the first producer of many petrochemical products and the only producer of propylene oxide in the Middle East.

In December 2020, the boards of directors appointed Othman Ali Al-Ghamdi as a board member and CEO, effective from Jan. 1, 2021, after the resignation of the CEO Nasser Damsheq Al-Mahasher.

References

External links
Petro Rabigh
Petro Rabigh on Google Finance
Honeywell Solutions Selected for One of World's Largest Integrated Oil Refining, Petrochemical Plants. 3 June 2008

Saudi Arabian companies established in 2005
Companies listed on Tadawul
Companies of Saudi Arabia
Petrochemical companies
Saudi Aramco
Japan–Saudi Arabia relations
Energy companies established in 2005